Lloyd Anthony Moseby (born November 5, 1959) is an American former Major League Baseball player. A center fielder, and good all-around athlete, Moseby's nickname, Shaker, was said to stem from his ability to get away from or "shake" players who attempted to defend him on the basketball court.

Career
Born in Portland, Arkansas, Moseby graduated from Oakland High School in Oakland, California. Moseby's primary sport in high school was basketball and he did not take baseball seriously until his sophomore year of high school. Moseby had committed to play college basketball for St. Mary's, one of 75 schools to offer him a basketball scholarship, if he had not decided to sign with the Blue Jays.

Drafted 2nd overall by the Toronto Blue Jays in the 1978 amateur draft, Moseby made his major league debut on May 24, 1980. Despite some growing pains early in his career, Moseby developed into a well-polished batter, fielder, and base-runner, driving in nearly 100 runs in three seasons (1984, 1986, and 1987) and regularly stealing 30-plus bases. Moseby finished in the top 25 for the American League Most Valuable Player Award twice—1983 and 1984.

In the mid-1980s, he was part of the powerful "Killer B's" outfield trio for the Jays, playing center field between George Bell and Jesse Barfield.  On April 19, 1983, he hit a walk-off two-run home run against Dan Spillner to give the Blue Jays a 9-7 victory over the Cleveland Indians. After the 1989 season, Moseby signed with the Detroit Tigers. Moseby saw limited action with the Tigers for two seasons and then traveled to Japan, where he played with the Yomiuri Giants in 1992 and 1993.

Over his career, Moseby had 869 runs, 169 home runs, 737 runs batted in, and 280 stolen bases with a career batting average of .257. He led the American League in triples in 1984 and was an All-Star in 1986. As of 2018, Moseby ranks in the top 10 for Toronto Blue Jays career leaders in WAR, games played, at-bats, runs, hits, doubles, triples, home runs, RBI, walks, stolen bases (franchise leader), and extra-base hits.

Moseby served as the Blue Jays' first base coach in 1998 and 1999.

In 2018, Moseby was inducted into the Canadian Baseball Hall of Fame. , Moseby was living on Queens Quay in Toronto.

See also
 List of Major League Baseball annual triples leaders

References

External links

, or Retrosheet
Pelota Binaria (Venezuelan Winter League)

1959 births
Living people
African-American baseball players
American expatriate baseball players in Canada
American expatriate baseball players in Japan
American League All-Stars
Baseball coaches from Arkansas
Baseball coaches from California
Baseball players from Arkansas
Baseball players from Oakland, California
Cardenales de Lara players
American expatriate baseball players in Venezuela
Detroit Tigers players
Dunedin Blue Jays players
Major League Baseball outfielders
Medicine Hat Blue Jays players
Nippon Professional Baseball outfielders
People from Ashley County, Arkansas
Silver Slugger Award winners
Syracuse Chiefs players
Toronto Blue Jays coaches
Toronto Blue Jays players
Yomiuri Giants players
21st-century African-American people
20th-century African-American sportspeople
Canadian Baseball Hall of Fame inductees